Web3 (also known as Web 3.0) is an idea for a new iteration of the World Wide Web which incorporates concepts such as decentralization, blockchain technologies, and token-based economics. Some technologists and journalists have contrasted it with Web 2.0, wherein they say data and content are centralized in a small group of companies sometimes referred to as "Big Tech". The term "Web3" was coined in 2014 by Ethereum co-founder Gavin Wood, and the idea gained interest in 2021 from cryptocurrency enthusiasts, large technology companies, and venture capital firms.

Some commentators argue that Web3 will provide increased data security, scalability, and privacy for users and combat the influence of large technology companies. They also raise concerns about the decentralized web component of Web3, citing the potential for low moderation and the proliferation of harmful content. Some have expressed concerns over the centralization of wealth to a small group of investors and individuals, or a loss of privacy due to more expansive data collection. Others, such as Elon Musk and Jack Dorsey, have argued that Web3 only serves as a buzzword or marketing term.

Background

Web 1.0 and Web 2.0 refer to eras in the history of the World Wide Web as it evolved through various technologies and formats. Web 1.0 refers roughly to the period from 1989 to 2004, where most sites consisted of static pages, and the vast majority of users were consumers, not producers of content. Web 2.0 is based around the idea of "the web as platform" and centers on user-created content uploaded to forums, social media and networking services, blogs, and wikis, among other services. Web 2.0 is generally considered to have begun around 2004 and continues to the current day.

Terminology
Web3 is distinct from Tim Berners-Lee's 1999 concept for a Semantic Web. In 2006, Berners-Lee described the Semantic Web as a component of Web 3.0, which is different from the meaning of Web3 in blockchain contexts. 

The term "Web3" was coined by Polkadot founder and Ethereum co-founder Gavin Wood in 2014, referring to a "decentralized online ecosystem based on blockchain." In 2021, the idea of Web3 gained popularity. Particular interest spiked toward the end of 2021, largely due to interest from cryptocurrency enthusiasts and investments from high-profile technologists and companies. Executives from venture capital firm Andreessen Horowitz traveled to Washington, D.C., in October 2021 to lobby for the idea as a potential solution to questions about regulation of the web, with which policymakers have been grappling.

Concept
Specific visions for Web3 differ, and the term has been described by Bloomberg as "hazy", but they revolve around the idea of decentralization and often incorporate blockchain technologies, such as various cryptocurrencies and non-fungible tokens (NFTs). Bloomberg has described Web3 as an idea that "would build financial assets, in the form of tokens, into the inner workings of almost anything you do online". A policy brief published by the Bennett Institute for Public Policy at the University of Cambridge defined Web3 as "the putative next generation of the web’s technical, legal, and payments infrastructure—including blockchain, smart contracts and cryptocurrencies." According to Liu, Zhuotao, et al (2021), three fundamental architectural enablers of Web3 were identified as a combination of decentralized or federated platforms, secured interoperability, and verifiable computing through distributed ledger technologies. 

Some visions are based around the concept of decentralized autonomous organizations (DAOs). Decentralized finance (DeFi) is another key concept; in it, users exchange currency without bank or government involvement. Self-sovereign identity allows users to identify themselves without relying on an authentication system such as OAuth, in which a trusted party has to be reached in order to assess identity. Technology scholars have argued that Web3 would likely run in tandem with Web 2.0 sites, with Web 2.0 sites likely adopting Web3 technologies in order to keep their services relevant.

Reception
Technologists and journalists have described Web3 as a possible solution to concerns about the over-centralization of the web in a few "Big Tech" companies. Some have expressed the notion that Web3 could improve data security, scalability, and privacy beyond what is currently possible with Web 2.0 platforms. Bloomberg states that skeptics say the idea "is a long way from proving its use beyond niche applications, many of them tools aimed at crypto traders". The New York Times reported that several investors are betting $27billion that Web3 "is the future of the internet".

Some Web 2.0 companies, including Reddit and Discord, have explored incorporating Web3 technologies into their platforms. On November 8, 2021, CEO Jason Citron tweeted a screenshot suggesting Discord might be exploring integrating cryptocurrency wallets into their platform. Two days later, and after heavy user backlash, Discord announced they had no plans to integrate such technologies and that it was an internal-only concept that had been developed in a company-wide hackathon.

Some legal scholars quoted by The Conversation have expressed concerns over the difficulty of regulating a decentralized web, which they reported might make it more difficult to prevent cybercrime, online harassment, hate speech, and the dissemination of child abuse images. But, the news website also states that, "[decentralized web] represents the cyber-libertarian views and hopes of the past that the internet can empower ordinary people by breaking down existing power structures". Some other critics of Web3 see the concept as a part of a cryptocurrency bubble, or as an extension of blockchain-based trends that they see as overhyped or harmful, particularly NFTs. Some critics have raised concerns about the environmental impact of cryptocurrencies and NFTs. Cryptocurrencies vary in efficiency, with proof of stake having been designed to be less energy intensive than the more widely used proof of work, although there is disagreement about how secure and decentralized this is in practice.  Others have expressed beliefs that Web3 and the associated technologies are a pyramid scheme.

Jack Dorsey, co-founder and former CEO of Twitter, dismissed Web3 as a "venture capitalists' plaything". Dorsey opined that Web3 will not democratize the internet, but it will shift power from players like Facebook to venture capital funds like Andreessen Horowitz.

Buzzword 
Liam Proven, writing for The Register, concludes that Web3 is "a myth, a fairy story. It's what parents tell their kids about at night if they want them to grow up to become economists".

In 2021, SpaceX and Tesla CEO Elon Musk expressed skepticism about Web3 in a tweet, saying that Web3 "seems more marketing buzzword than reality right now". 

In November 2021, James Grimmelmann of Cornell University referred to Web3 as vaporware, calling it "a promised future internet that fixes all the things people don't like about the current internet, even when it's contradictory". Grimmelmann also argued that moving the internet toward a blockchain-focused infrastructure would centralize and cause more data collection compared to the current internet.

Software engineer Stephen Diehl described Web3 in a blog post as a "vapid marketing campaign that attempts to reframe the public’s negative associations of crypto assets into a false narrative about disruption of legacy tech company hegemony".

Not decentralised 
Kevin Werbach, author of The Blockchain and the New Architecture of Trust, has said that "many so-called 'Web 3.0' solutions are not as decentralized as they seem, while others have yet to show they are scalable, secure and accessible enough for the mass market", adding that this "may change, but it's not a given that all these limitations will be overcome".

In early 2022, Moxie Marlinspike, creator of Signal, articulated how Web3 is not as decentralized as it appears to be, mainly due to consolidation in the cryptocurrency field, including in blockchain application programming interfaces which is currently mainly controlled by the companies Alchemy and Infura, cryptocurrency exchanges which is mainly dominated by Binance, Coinbase, MetaMask, and OpenSea, and the stablecoin market which is currently dominated by Tether. Marlinspike also remarked that the new web resembles the old web.

An Ad Age article from 2022 stated "early adopters want to make a new internet that alleviates the problems of the old one" but said if companies put the same type people in charge as on the earlier version, and those people had similar attitudes, the same problems would happen. Another article in the same issue of the magazine quoted Alex Smeele, co-founder of Non-Fungible Labs, who said companies that wanted to participate in Web3 were "actually going to have to rethink their entire business model."

Ana Constantino, founder of meetup platform Nowhere, said the metaverse did not really welcome everyone, because owners of NFT real estate on sites such as Decentraland could keep people out who did not have the assets.

See also
 Distributed social network
 InterPlanetary File System – Web3 user-made cloud

References

2020s in Internet culture
Blockchains
Decentralization
Internet ages
2014 neologisms
Web3